The list of ship launches in 1672 includes a chronological list of some ships launched in 1672.


References

1672
Ship launches